Sabarmati–Mahesana DEMU is a DEMU train belonging to Western Railway zone that runs between  in Gujarat and  of Gujarat. It is currently being operated with 79431/79432 train numbers on daily basis.

Route and halts

The important halts of the train are:

Average speed and frequency

79431/Sabarmati–Mahesana DEMU has average speed of 47 km/h and completes 63 km in 1 hour 20 minutes.
79432/Mahesana–Sabarmati DEMU has average speed of 38 km/h and completes 63 km in 1 hour 40 minutes. There are seven trains which run on a daily basis

Schedule

Traction 

DEMU: Rated power is 1600 HP and has 10 coaches with maximum speed is 110 kmph. Transmission is AC electric. Rakes are made at ICF coach.

Rake sharing

The rake is shared with 79437/7948 Mahesana–Abu Road DEMU

See also 

 Mahesana Junction railway station
 Mahesana–Abu Road DEMU

Notes

References

External links 

 79431/Sabarmati–Mahesana DEMU
 79432/Mahesana–Sabarmati DEMU

Transport in Mehsana
Transport in Ahmedabad
Rail transport in Gujarat
Diesel–electric multiple units of India